Joseph Mario Molina (born May 16, 1958) is the former business executive CEO of Molina Healthcare healthcare industry.

Current executive roles
Following the death of his father and founder of the company, C. David Molina, MD in 1996, Molina took on two key executive roles at Molina Healthcare Inc.: chief executive officer, chairman of the board and president.

He is also a director of America's Health Insurance Plans and a member of: the Financial Solvency Standards Board, the American College of Physicians, California Medical Association and the boards of: the California Association of Health Insurance Plans, Aquarium of the Pacific, and the Homeboy Industries. He is also on the board of trustees at Johns Hopkins Medicine.

In 2009 Molina Healthcare took in $3.7 billion, of which $31 million was profit. Molina's personal total compensation for 2014 was: $7,854,147.

Employment history
Prior to his leadership roles at the firm, Molina held a number of other key roles at Molina Healthcare.  These included: Medical Director (supervising medical and risk management matters) and vice president (in charge of provider contracting, member services, marketing and QA).

Education
Molina's M.D. is from the University of Southern California, where he was elected to membership in Alpha Omega Alpha and Sigma Xi.  He has an honorary doctorate from Claremont Graduate University.

Molina did his medical internship and residency at the Johns Hopkins Hospital. After that, he was a fellow for four years at the University of California, San Diego, and the San Diego Veterans Affairs Medical Center, in endocrinology and metabolism.  Thereafter he became assistant professor of medicine at USC.

Awards and recognition
Molina received the Ernst & Young Greater Los Angeles Entrepreneur of the Year Award in 2002. In the same year, he was inducted into the Long Beach Community College Hall of Fame.  He became an honoree of the Greater Long Beach National Conference for Community and Justice. Time Magazine featured him as one of America's most influential Hispanics in 2005.

Molina Healthcare: Origins
The whole family launched the business, with Mario, Joseph, John and  three sisters working at the first three clinics.  They were expected to help out so they worked the reception desk, painted buildings, cleaned, washed windows and did anything that needed to be done, other than seeing patients.  Mario however did eventually see patients, after qualifying as a doctor.

References

American health care chief executives
1959 births
Living people
Keck School of Medicine of USC alumni